Malachi Moore (born September 13, 2001) is an American football strong safety for the Alabama Crimson Tide.

Early years
Moore attended Hewitt-Trussville High School in Trussville, Alabama. He played both cornerback and safety in high school. As a senior, he had 80 tackles and four interceptions. He was selected to play in the 2020 All-American Bowl. Moore committed to the University of Alabama to play college football.

College career
Moore became a starter during his true freshman year at Alabama in 2020.

References

External links
Alabama Crimson Tide bio

Living people
People from Trussville, Alabama
Players of American football from Alabama
American football safeties
American football cornerbacks
Alabama Crimson Tide football players
2001 births